Belmont is a suburb of Perth, the capital city of Western Australia, and is located  east of Perth's central business district (CBD) on the southern bank of the Swan River. Its local government area is the City of Belmont.

The suburb, part of a land grant assigned to Captain Francis Henry Byrne in 1831, was believed to have been named Belmont after Byrne's estate in England. The land was purchased by Shepherd Smith of Sydney in 1882, who subdivided it in 1897–1898.

The local government body based in Belmont was originally known as the Belmont Park Road Board.

The suburb was known as "Belmont Park" until being renamed in 1968.

Today, the suburb is mixed-use in character. The western part of the suburb is primarily industrial and commercial, while the east and north are more residential, with various motels and other accommodation along Great Eastern Highway, which forms the suburb's north-western boundary. It contains two public schools—Belmont Primary School, and Belmont City College (formerly Belmont Senior High School)—as well as Centenary Park, Signal Hill Bushland, the Belgravia Residential Estate and a  section on the south bank of the Swan River.

Belmont possesses a sister city partnership with Adachi, Tokyo in Japan, which has been in place since October 1984.

References 

 
Suburbs of Perth, Western Australia
Suburbs in the City of Belmont